The Howrah–Kanyakumari Express is a Superfast inter-city express service connecting Howrah (Kolkata), West Bengal with Kanyakumari, Tamil Nadu in India. It runs with highly refurbished LHB coaches designed at ICF, Chennai.

Overview
This express train was, numbered 6355/6356, introduced during the 1999–2000 Railway Budget as a new weekly train extending the Tiruchirappalli – Howrah Superfast Express, thereby truncating the service of the latter from tri–weekly  to bi–weekly. The train connecting Howrah/Kolkata in West Bengal and Kanyakumari in Tamil Nadu made its inaugural run on 1 July 2000. This train was converted to Superfast category and re-numbered to 2665/2666 from 1 December 2006 onwards. Later, the train number was changed to 12665/12666 from December 2010 onwards as a part of train management system over the entire Indian Railways network.

Rakes
The train has 22 coaches comprising One AC 2-Tier, Three AC 3-tier, Eleven Sleeper class, Three General compartments (Unreserved), Two Sleeper-cum-Luggage rake (SLR), One High-Capacity Parcel Van (HCPV) and one pantry car.

Schedule
The train numbered 12665 leaves  at 16:15 hours every Mondays and arrives  at 10:50 hours on Wednesdays. On the return journey, the train leaves  at 05:30 hours every Saturdays and arrives  at 23:55 hours on Sundays.

See also
 Tiruchirappalli – Howrah Superfast Express
 Cholan Express
 Pallavan Express
 Vaigai express
 Tiruchirappalli – Tirunelveli Intercity Express
 IRCTC

Notes

References

External links
 Southern Railway - Official Website

Express trains in India
Railway services introduced in 2000
Rail transport in West Bengal
Rail transport in Tamil Nadu
Rail transport in Andhra Pradesh
Rail transport in Odisha